Swan Bridge is a Grade II listed bridge over the Castle Mill Stream in the city of Oxford, England. It forms part of Paradise Street. The bridge is close to Oxford Castle to the north. Also to the north on the Castle Mill Stream is Quaking Bridge. To the south is a bridge for Oxpens Road.

The bridge was Grade II listed in 1972.

Also located in Paradise Street close to the bridge on the Castle Mill Stream was the Swan's Nest Brewery (later the Swan Brewery), dating from the early 18th century.

References

Bridges in Oxford
Grade II listed buildings in Oxford